Pseudatemelia amparoella is a moth of the family Oecophoridae. It was described by Vives in 1986. It is found on the Iberian Peninsula.

References

Moths described in 1986
Amphisbatinae